The Nerve could refer to:

The Nerve (magazine), a defunct Canadian monthly music magazine
The Nerve (radio network), an active rock music service from Citadel Media
KTUM, "107.1 The Nerve", a radio station licensed to serve Tatum, New Mexico, United States
"Bearded Billy"/"The Nerve", a 2004 episode of The Grim Adventures of Billy & Mandy
The Nerves, an American power pop trio based in Los Angeles in the 1970s
The Nerve, an investigative journalism and news website founded by the South Carolina Policy Council